United Nations station (also known as U.N. Avenue station) is an elevated Manila Light Rail Transit (LRT) station on Line 1. The station serves Ermita in Manila, and is located above the intersection of Taft and United Nations Avenues. The station is named after United Nations Avenue, which in turn is named after the United Nations organization.

United Nations station is also near educational institutions such as the Technological University of the Philippines, the Philippine Normal University, Adamson University, Santa Isabel College Manila, Emilio Aguinaldo College, and Araullo High School. It is convenient to several tourist destinations including Rizal Park, the National Museum of Fine Arts, the National Museum of Anthropology, and the National Museum of Natural History. It is also adjacent to the World Health Organization Western Pacific Region office and National Bureau of Investigation headquarters. It is also near public squares such as Plaza Salamanca and Plaza Rueda, as well as Paco Park.

Transportation links
United Nations station is served by buses, jeepneys, and UV Express along Taft Avenue and other nearby routes. Regular taxis and cycle rickshaws also stop at and near the station.

Gallery

See also
List of rail transit stations in Metro Manila
Manila Light Rail Transit System

Manila Light Rail Transit System stations
Railway stations opened in 1984
Buildings and structures in Ermita